Bertram Vivian Bowden, Baron Bowden (18 January 1910 – 28 July 1989) was an English scientist and educationist, particularly associated with the development of UMIST as a successful university.

Life
Born, Chesterfield, Derbyshire, he attended Hasland Junior School as a child and graduated in natural sciences from Emmanuel College, Cambridge (1931), taking his Ph.D. in nuclear physics while working at Cavendish Laboratory under Ernest Rutherford. From 1934-1935 he was sponsored by ICI to undertake research at the University of Amsterdam.

After a period in teaching, in 1940 he was conscripted to the Telecommunications Research Establishment to work on radar, including an improved system to distinguish between friend and foe. From 1943, he continued his work at the U.S. Naval Research Laboratory, establishing himself as an able and effective administrator. From the end of World War II to 1953 he held a series of jobs, including selling early computers manufactured by Ferranti. His prescient forecasts of the impact that the technology would have on daily life were published in his 1953 book Faster than Thought.

In 1953, Bowden became principal of the Manchester College of Science and Technology, a vocational education college in Manchester. The post-war expansion in university education in Britain, coupled with Bowden's energy, creativity and lobbying soon entailed the college's transformation into UMIST (University of Manchester Institute of Science and Technology).

On 18 January 1964, he was created a life peer as Baron Bowden, of Chesterfield in the County of Derby and later in this year, Harold Wilson appointed him Minister for Education and Science. However, Westminster and the labyrinths of the civil service were ill-matched to Bowden's direct approach and, in 1965 he returned to UMIST. He retired in 1976.

Bowden was married four times and had three children. He died in Bowdon, Cheshire.

Islamic finance
Bowden was interested in Islamic finance and economics, enough to suggest an Institute for the History of Islamic Science and Commerce, though this never materialised. His interest in the subject continued and he once mentioned the subject at length in the House of Lords. His interest in the subject was spurred by his colleague Salim Al-Hassani.

Honours
Distinguished Fellow of the British Computer Society (1976)
Honorary Fellow of the Institution of Civil Engineers (1975);
Pioneer Award of the Institute of Electrical and Electronics Engineers (1973).

References

Bibliography
 
Papers of Lord Bowden at the University of Manchester Library.
Entwistle, K.M. (2004) "(Bertram) Vivian, Baron Bowden (1910-1989)", rev., Oxford Dictionary of National Biography, Oxford University Press, accessed 17 June 2005 

Bowden 1975, "Effects of World War II on education in science"

1910 births
1989 deaths
Academics of the University of Manchester Institute of Science and Technology
Alumni of Emmanuel College, Cambridge
English educational theorists
English physicists
Fellows of the British Computer Society
Life peers
Ministers in the Wilson governments, 1964–1970
People educated at Chesterfield Grammar School
People from Chesterfield, Derbyshire
Life peers created by Elizabeth II